This is a bibliography of works about King Arthur, his family, his friends or his enemies. This bibliography includes works that are notable or are by notable authors.

6th century
De Excidio et Conquestu Britanniae by Gildas, mentions the Battle of Mons Badonicus, but famously neglects to mention Arthur

9th century
Historia Brittonum attributed to Nennius

10th century

Latin
 Annales Cambriae, anonymous

Welsh
 Preiddeu Annwfn attributed to Taliesin
 "Pa Gur yv y Porthaur " or "Who is the gatekeeper?", anonymous (a dialogue between Arthur and a gatekeeper, in which he boasts about Cei's battle with the Cath Palug)
 Englynion y Beddau or Stanzas of the graves, anonymous (Arthur's grave site is a mystery)

11th century

Latin
 The Legend of St. Goeznovius, anonymous c. 1019 (Saxon resurgence when Arthur is "recalled from the actions of the world" may be reference to his immortality. Vortigern mentioned)
Vita Sancti Cadoc by Lifris of Llancarfan c. 1086 (Arthur wants to ravish Gwladys whom Gundliauc elopes with, but aids them by Kay and Bedivere's counsel. St. Cadoc harbors a killer of Arthur's men and pays cattle as recompense, but they transform into bundles of ferns.)

Welsh
 Trioedd Ynys Prydein (Triads of the Isle of Britain) 11th–14th century. (Twelve triads referring to Arthur. Others mention (Mabon) and Drystan (Tristan), etc.)
 Trioedd y meirch (The Triads of the Horses) (Mentions the horse names of Cei (Sir Kay), Gwalchmai's horse Ceincaled.)
 Tri Thlws ar Ddeg Ynys Prydain (Thirteen Treasures of the Island of Britain) 15th–16th centuries
 Pedwar marchog ar hugain llys (Twenty-four Knights of Arthur's Court) 15th–16th centuries Mentions the sword Caledfwlch and the spear Rhongomiant

12th century

Welsh
 Culhwch and Olwen, anonymous, c. 1100

Latin
Vita Sancti Carannog c. 1100 (At Arthur's requests, Carantoc tames a dragon. Cato (=Kay) is depicted as feeding it.)
Vita Sancti Euflami c. 1100 (Arthur cannot defeat dragon, but Efflam causes it to plunge from a rock through prayer)
Vita Sancti Paternus c. 1120s (Mentions Arthur and Caradoc)
Gesta Regum Anglorum by William of Malmesbury 1125 (Arthur wears image of Mary; Discovery of Gawain's tomb.)
Historia Anglorum by Henry of Huntingdon 1129 (Mentions Arthur)
Vita Santi Gildae by Caradoc of Llancarfan c. 1120–1130 (early version of Malegant-Guenivere abduction narrative.) 
Works of Geoffrey of Monmouth are the main source of information for those writing on the legend. 
Historia Regum Britanniae c. 1136–8
Vita Merlini c. 1150
 Vera historia de morte Arthuri
 De miraculis sanctae Mariae Laudunensis by Herman of Tournai 1147 (early witness to the legend of Arthur's survival)
 Life of Saint Kentigern by Jocelyn of Furness c. 1185 (Contains a version of the legend of Merlin, here called Lailoken)
Vita Sancti Illtud c. 1190s (Illtud came across from Brittany to visit his cousin Arthur's court. King Mark mentioned.)

French and Anglo-Norman
 Roman de Brut by Wace c. 1155 (an Anglo-Norman verse reworking of Historia Regum Britanniae)
 Tristan by Thomas of Britain c. 1170s
 Tristan by Béroul c. 1170s
 Folie Tristan d'Oxford, c. 1175–1200
 The Lais of Marie de France c. 1170s
Lanval
 Chevrefoil c. 1170s (an episode of the Tristan and Iseult story)
The poems of Chrétien de Troyes
 Erec and Enide c. 1170s
 Cligés c. 1170s
 Yvain, the Knight of the Lion c. 1180s
 Lancelot, the Knight of the Cart c. 1180s
 Perceval, le Conte du Graal c. 1190
 Tristan mentioned but non-extant
The poems of Robert de Boron
 (extant)
 Merlin (partly extant in 300 lines)
 Perceval
The  c. 1190-1215 (a rendering of a lost poem titled Perceval by Robert de Boron)
 Lai du Cor by Robert Biket. (Caradoc succeeds in drinking from horn, proves wife's chastity.) 
 La Mantel Mautaillé. (Caradoc's wife passes chastity test by wearing ill-fitting mantel.) 
 La Mule sans frein c. 1200

German
 Tristan by Eilhart von Oberge c. 1170s
 Lanzelet by Ulrich von Zatzikhoven late 12th century (a rendering of a lost French tale of Lancelot that likely predates Chrétien de Troyes's famous Lancelot or the Knight of the Cart. Ulrich von Zatzikhoven obtained a copy of the original book in 1194 and translated the work from French into German.)
 The poems of Hartmann von Aue 
Iwein, late 12th century (German adaptation of Chrétien's Yvain, the Knight of the Lion)
Erec, late 12th century (expanded reworking of Chrétien's Erec and Enide)

13th century

French, Anglo-Norman or Provençal
 Roman de Fergus by Guillaume le Clerc 1190s/1200s
 Jaufré c. 1180 or 1225 (Occitan verse)
 La Vengeance Raguidel c. 1200–1225 by Raoul (sometimes identified as Raoul de Houdenc) 
Lancelot-Grail (Vulgate Cycle), anonymous c. 1210s–1230s
 Estoire del Saint Grail
 Estoire de Merlin
 Lancelot propre
 Queste del Saint Graal
 Mort Artu
Perlesvaus, anonymous, c. 1210s
 Prose Tristan by "Luce de Gat" (1230s) and "Helie de Boron" (c. 1240)
 Roman de Silence by Heldrius de Cornwall c. 1260s
 Post-Vulgate Cycle, anonymous (begun 1230s, finished 1240s)
  L'âtre périlleux, anonymous (c. 1250) 
 Roman de Roi Artus aka Compilation by Rusticiano (Rustichello da Pisa); Franco-Italian, c. 1290s–1300
 Gyron le courtois (A portion of the Compilation published 1501?)
 Meliadus de Leonnoys (Another portion, published 1528 by Galliot du Pré, 1532 by Denys Janot)

German
 Tristan by Gottfried von Strassburg c. 1210s
 Parzival by Wolfram von Eschenbach c. 1210s
 Daniel von Blumenthal by Der Stricker c. 1220
 Diu Crône Heinrich von dem Türlin
 The poems of Der Pleier
 Garel von dem blühenden Tal, c. 1230s or c. 1250–80
 Tandareis und Flordibel c. 1250–80
 Meleranz c. 1250–80
 Der Mantel, once attributed to Heinrich von dem Türlin. (The "ill-fitting mantle" chastity test theme)

Norse
Brother Robert's prose renditions
Tristrams saga ok Ísöndar 1226 (Norse reworking Tristan by Thomas of Britain)
 Ivens saga 1226 (Norse reworking of Chrétien's Yvain, the Knight of the Lion)
 Erex saga, perhaps originally by Robert. (Text probably changed in MS. transmission. A Norse reworking of Chrétien's Erec and Enide)
 Möttuls saga, adaptation of the "ill-fitting mantle" story.
 Strengleikar (Translations of lais mostly by Marie de France)
 "Geitarlauf" (Translation of Chevrefoil) 
 "Januals ljóð" (Translation of Lanval)

English
 Brut by Layamon (English reworking of Historia Regum Britanniae)
 Sir Tristrem c. 1300 (English reworking of Tristan by Thomas of Britain)
 Arthour and Merlin c. 1300

Dutch
 , by Penninc and Pieter Vostaert 
Roman van Ferguut (translation and reworking of the Roman de Fergus)
The Lancelot Compilation (an adaptation of the Lancelot-Grail and other romances, 10 in all:)
 Lanceloet
 Perchevael 
 Moriaen (Morien)
 
 Wrake van Ragisel (Adaptation of Vengeance Raguidel)
 Ridder metter mouwen ("The Knight with the Sleeve" )
 Walewein ende Keye
 Lanceloet en het hert met de witte voet ("Lancelot and the Stag with the White Foot")
 Torec, by Jacob van Maerlant
 Arturs doet

Hebrew
Melech Artus ("King Artus"), a 1279 Hebrew translation, and the first in that language, which was published in Italy. Contains several short parts of the Vulgate Cycle: the Pendragon's seduction of Igraine and Arthur's death. Total of 5 pages, at the end of a larger codex on calendar astronomy titled Sefer ha-I'bbur ("the book of making leap years"). Anonymous author.

Welsh
Brut y Brenhinedd, Welsh chronicle adaptation of Geoffrey of Monmouth's Historia Regum Britanniae
The Dream of Rhonabwy, anonymous
The Black Book of Carmarthen, anonymous (mentions Arthur)

14th century

English
 Alliterative Morte Arthure, anonymous
 Stanzaic Morte Arthur, anonymous
 The Avowyng of Arthur 
 The Wedding of Sir Gawain and Dame Ragnelle, anonymous
 The Awntyrs off Arthure, anonymous
 Sir Cleges (not closely related to Chrestien's Cliges; set in Uther Pendragon's court.) 
 Sir Gawain and the Green Knight by The Pearl Poet
 Sir Launfal by Thomas Chestre (a remaking of the lai of Lanval)
 Sir Libeaus Desconus
 Yvain and Gawain
 Sir Perceval of Galles
 Lancelot of the Laik

Welsh
(All dates for the Welsh compositions are controversial)

 Mabinogion, anonymous
 Culhwch and Olwen (recorded) 
 The Welsh Romances
 Owain, or the Lady of the Fountain
 Geraint and Enid
 Peredur, son of Efrawg

Italian
 Tavola Rottonda, anonymous

French
 Perceforest, anonymous

Catalan
 La Faula by Guillem de Torroella

Greek
 Presbys Hippotes (Greek reworking of part of Rustichello da Pisa's Compilations)

15th century

English
 Arthur 
 Le Morte d'Arthur by Sir Thomas Malory
 Prose Merlin 
 "King Arthur and King Cornwall"
Sir Gawain and the Carle of Carlisle

Italian
 Orlando Innamorato by Matteo Maria Boiardo
 Tavola Ritonda, anonymous

Icelandic
 Skikkju Rimur, (a rendition of the "ill-fitting mantle" story)

Breton
 An Dialog etre Arzur Roe d'an Bretounet ha Guynglaff, anonymous

16th century

English
 Arthur of Little Britain 
 The Greene Knight, c. 1500
 The Boy and the Mantle (ballad in the Percy folio, chastity test story of the "ill-fitting mantle" and the horn)
 The Knightly Tale of Gologras and Gawain, 1508
 The Jeaste of Sir Gawain 
 The Misfortunes of Arthur by Thomas Hughes, 1587
 The Faerie Queene by Edmund Spenser, 1590

Welsh
 Tristan Romance, preserved in fragmentary form in several MSS.

Byelo-Russian
 Povest Trychane 1560s

17th century

English
 Works of Richard Johnson
 Tom a Lincoln (1607)
 The History of Tom Thumbe, the Little, for his small stature surnamed, King Arthurs Dwarfe (1621)
 The Birth of Merlin, or, The Childe Hath Found His Father by William Rowley (?1620; first published 1662)
 Works of Richard Blackmore
 Prince Arthur: An Heroick Poem in Ten Books (1695)
 King Arthur: An Heroick Poem in Twelve Books (1697)

Yiddish
 Widwilt (Yiddish reworking of Le Bel Inconnu)

18th century
Warton, Thomas (1728–1790) 
 "The Grave of King Arthur" (1777)
 "On King Arthur's Round-table at Winchester" (1777)
 Vortigern and Rowena by W. H. Ireland (1799) (A Shakespearian forgery)

19th century
 "Arthur o' Bower" (1805)
 The Lady of Shalott by Alfred, Lord Tennyson (1833)
 The Legends of King Arthur and His Knights by James Knowles (1862)
 The Boy's King Arthur by Sidney Lanier (1880)
 Tristram of Lyonesse by Algernon Charles Swinburne (1882)
 Idylls of the King by Alfred, Lord Tennyson (1859–1885)
 A Connecticut Yankee in King Arthur's Court by Mark Twain (1889)

20th century

English
 Howard Pyle - In a four volume set including:
 "The Story of King Arthur and His Knights" (1903)
 "The Story of the Champions of the Round Table" (1905)
 "The Story of Sir Launcelot and His Companions" (1907)
 "The Story of the Grail and the Passing of King Arthur" (1910)
 Kairo-kō (1905) by Natsume Sōseki
 The Life of Sir Aglovale de Galis (1905) by Clemence Housman
 War in Heaven (1930) by Charles W. S. Williams, a "modern-day" (20th century) quest for the Holy Grail
 The Little Wench (1935) by Philip Lindsay
 Merlin's Godson by H. Warner Munn
 King of the World's Edge (1936)
 The Ship from Atlantis (1967)
 Merlin's Ring (1974)
 Taliessin through Logres (1938) and The Region of the Summer Stars (1944) by Charles W. S. Williams (poem cycles)
 The Once and Future King by T. H. White including
 The Sword in the Stone (1938)
 The Queen of Air and Darkness (or The Witch in the Wood) (1939)
 The Ill-Made Knight (1940)
 The Candle in the Wind (1958)
 The Book of Merlyn (1958)
 That Hideous Strength (1945) by C. S. Lewis
 Porius (A Romance of the Dark Ages) (1951) by John Cowper Powys
King Arthur and His Knights of the Round Table (1953) by Roger Lancelyn Green
 The Great Captains (1956) by Henry Treece
 Rosemary Sutcliff's Arthurian novels:
 The Lantern Bearers (1959)
 Sword at Sunset (1963)
 Tristan and Iseult (1971)
 The Shining Company (1990), a retelling of the Y Gododdin, which contains the earliest mention of Arthur's name 
 The Arthurian Trilogy (1979–1981), re-issued in an omnibus edition in 2007 as The King Arthur Trilogy: 
 The Light Beyond the Forest (1979)
 The Sword and the Circle (1981)
 The Road to Camlann (1981)
 A Trace of Memory (1963) by Keith Laumer
 The Merlin series by Mary Stewart
 The Crystal Cave (1970)
 The Hollow Hills (1973)
 The Last Enchantment (1979)
 The Wicked Day (1983)
 The Prince and the Pilgrim (1995)
 The Acts of King Arthur and His Noble Knights (1975) by John Steinbeck
 The Mabinogion Tetralogy (1974) by Evangeline Walton.
 Arthur Rex: A Legendary Novel by Thomas Berger (1978)
 The Three Damosels (1978) and The Enchantresses (1998) by Vera Chapman (the latter with Mike Ashley)
 The Old French Tristan Poems (1980) by David J. Shirt
 The Mists of Avalon (1983) by Marion Zimmer Bradley
 L'Enchanteur (1984) by René Barjavel
 The White Raven (1988) by Diana L. Paxson (Tristan and Isseult)
 The Pendragon Cycle by Stephen Lawhead
 Taliesin (1987)
 Merlin (1988)
 Arthur (1989)
 Pendragon (1994)
 Grail (1997)
 Avalon (1999)
 The Guinevere trilogy by Persia Woolley
 Child of the Northern Spring (1987)
 Queen of the Summer Stars (1991)
 Guinevere: The Legend in Autumn (1993)
 Knight Life (1987), One Knight Only (2004) and Fall of Knight (2007) by Peter David
 The Road to Avalon (1988) by Joan Wolf
The King (1990) by Donald Barthelme
The Arthor series by A. A. Attanasio
The Dragon and the Unicorn (1994)
The Eagle and the Sword (1997)
The Wolf and the Crown (1998)
The Serpent and the Grail (1999)
 The Child Queen (1994), The High Queen (1995), (collected in Queen of Camelot (2002)), Prince of Dreams (2004), and Grail Prince (2003) by Nancy McKenzie
 I Am Mordred (1998) by Nancy Springer
 Hallowed Isle by Diana L. Paxson: The Book of the Sword (1999), The Book of the Spear (1999), The Book of the Cauldron (1999), The Book of the Stone (2000).
 The Guenevere novels by Rosalind Miles
 Guenevere, Queen of the Summer Country (1999)
 The Knight of the Sacred Lake (2000)
 Child of the Holy Grail (2000)
 The Warlord Chronicles by Bernard Cornwell
 The Winter King
 Enemy of God
 Excalibur
 By Jane Yolen:
 Sword of the Rightful King
 The Young Merlin Trilogy
 By Gerald Morris:
 The Squire's Tale
 The Squire, His Knight, and His Lady
 The Savage Damsel and the Dwarf
 Parsifal's Page
 The Ballad of Sir Dinadan
 The Princess, the Crone, and the Dung-Cart Knight
 The Lioness and her Knight
 The Quest of the Fair Unknown
 Squire's Quest
 The Legend of the King
 The Adventures of Sir Givret the Short
 The Adventures of Sir Lancelot the Great
By Molly Cochran and Warren Murphy
 The Forever King
 The Broken Sword
 The Third Magic
 The Coming of the King: The First Book of Merlin by Nikolai Tolstoy (1988)
 Stones of Power by David Gemmell
 Ghost King (1988)
 Last Sword of Power (1988)
 Anonymous
 King Arthur and His Knights of the Round Table (Illustrated Junior Library, Deluxe edition, September 1, 1950)
 To the Chapel Perilous Naomi Mitchison (1955)
 Artorius by John Heath-Stubbs
 Quirinius, Britannia's Last Roman by Erik Hildinger (2021)
 Our Man in Camelot by Anthony Price (1975) (The sixth book in the Dr. David Audley series uses the Arthur myth as a MacGuffin in a modern spy thriller.)
 By Parke Godwin
Firelord (1980)
Beloved Exile (1984)
The Last Rainbow (1985)
 The Pendragon's Banner Trilogy by Helen Hollick (re-published UK 2007 & USA 2009)
Book One: The Kingmaking (1994)
Book Two: Pendragon's Banner (1995)
Book Three: Shadow of the King (1997)
 The Tales of Arthur, books of The Keltiad, by Patricia Kennealy-Morrison
 The Hawk's Grey Feather (1991)
 The Oak Above the Kings (1994)
 The Hedge of Mist (1996)
 A Dream of Eagles (Camulod Chronicles) by Jack Whyte
The Sky Stone (1992)
The Singing Sword (1993)
The Eagles' Brood (1994)
The Saxon Shore (1998)
The Sorcerer Part 1: The Fort at River's Bend (1997)
The Sorcerer Part 2: The Sorcerer: Metamorphosis (1999)
 Uther (2001)
 Clothar the Frank (titled The Lance Thrower outside of Canada) (2004)
 The Eagle (2006)
 The Lost Years of Merlin Epic, by T.A. Barron
The Lost Years of Merlin (1996)
The Seven Songs of Merlin (1997)
The Fires of Merlin (1998)
The Mirror of Merlin (1999)
The Wings of Merlin (2000)
 Albion, a trilogy of historical novels by British author Patrick McCormack (1997, 2000, 2007)
 The King Awakes and The Empty Throne by Janice Elliott, set in a Medieval-style society several generations after a nuclear war. Both novels deal with the return of King Arthur and his friendship with a youth from the post-holocaust world
Merlin's Bones by Fred Saberhagen
The Idylls of the Queen by Phyllis Ann Karr
Eagle in the Snow by Wallace Breem; the coming of Arthur is foreseen by the chief of Segontium in the last page of the book
The Winter Prince by Elizabeth Wein
The Dragon Lord by David Drake
Merlin's Mirror (1975) by Andre Norton
The Return of Merlin (1995) by Deepak Chopra
Guinevere series (1996), by Sharan Newman.
Black Horses for the King (1996) by Anne McCaffrey.
Camelot 3000, a comic book series that reincarnates Arthur and his knights in the far future
The Dark Is Rising, a series written for older children and young adults, by Susan Cooper
The Fionavar Tapestry, a fantasy trilogy by Canadian author Guy Gavriel Kay
The Merlin Mystery, A puzzlehunt book which focused heavily on Merlin and Nimue having a love after Arthur has been entombed; it offered a cash prize as well as a gold, silver, bronze and crystal wand. However, the puzzle went unsolved and the prize unclaimed.
 The Down the Long Wind series by Gillian Bradshaw (1980–82)
 Hawk of May
 Kingdom of Summer
 In Winter's Shadow
The Little Wench by Philip Lindsay
Merlin (1978) by Robert Nye
A Lady of King Arthur's Court (1907) by Sara Hawks Sterling

Welsh
 Ymadawiad Arthur (1902) by Thomas Gwynn Jones

21st century

The Secrets of the Immortal Nicholas Flamel series by Michael Scott mentions many artifacts and characters from Arthurian legend
The Magic Tree House Books (1992-Present) by Mary Pope Osbourne, feature Morgan Le Fay as a prominent character in the original series. The later series, entitled The Magic Tree House: Merlin Missions, more prominently included elements from Arthurian Legend. Includes works such as:
 Christmas in Camelot (2001)
Haunted Castle on Hallow's Eve (2003)
 Summer of the Sea Serpent (2004)
 Winter of the Ice Wizard (2004)
Night of the Ninth Dragon (2016)
I am Morgan le Fay (2001) by Nancy Springer
The Merlin Codex by Robert Holdstock
Celtika (2001)
The Iron Grail (2002)
The Broken Kings (2007)
 Tales of Guinevere series by Alice Borchardt.
 Corbenic by Catherine Fisher (2002)
 Tristan and Isolde (2002) series by Rosalind Miles
 Sword of the Rightful King by Jane Yolen (2003)
 The House of Pendragon by Debra A. Kemp
I: The Firebrand (2003)
II: The Recruit (2007)
The Extraordinary Adventures of Alfred Kropp by Rick Yancey (2005)
 Douglas Clegg: Mordred, Bastard Son (2006)
 Fate/Zero by Gen Urobuchi (2006–2007)
 Dracula vs. King Arthur by Adam Beranek, Christian Beranek and Chris Moreno (2007)
 Orion and King Arthur by Ben Bova (2011)
 Song of the Sparrow by Lisa Ann Sandell (2007)
 Camelot Lost by Jessica Bonito (Jessica McHugh) (2008)
 Avalon High by Meg Cabot
 The Sangreal Trilogy by Amanda Hemingway
Sword of Darkness by Kinley MacGregor
Knight of Darkness by Kinley MacGregor
 Here Lies Arthur by Philip Reeve
 The Book of Mordred by Vivian Vande Velde
Sons of Avalon, Merlin's Prophecy by Dee Marie (2008)
 Sarah Zettel's four-part series about the brothers Gawain, Gareth, Agravain, and Geraint:
 In Camelot's Shadow (2004)
 For Camelot's Honor (2005)
 Under Camelot's Banner (2006)
 Camelot's Blood (2008)
Merlin's Dragon Trilogy by T.A. Barron
 Merlin Book 6: The Dragon of Avalon; originally issued as Merlin's Dragon (2008)
 Merlin Book 7: Doomraga's Revenge (2009)
 Merlin Book 8: Ultimate Magic (2010)
The Great Tree of Avalon Trilogy
 Merlin Book 9: The Great Tree of Avalon; originally issued as Child of the Dark Prophecy (2004)
 Merlin Book 10: Shadows on the Stars (2005)
 Merlin Book 11: The Eternal Flame (2007)
The Book of Magic
 Merlin Book 12: Merlin: The Book of Magic (2011), companion to the Merlin Saga
Gwenhwyfar (2009) by Mercedes Lackey.
By Nakaba Suzuki
The Seven Deadly Sins (2012–2020), a manga loosely based on the Arthurian legend
Four Knights of the Apocalypse (2021-present)
The School for Good and Evil series contains many Arthurian figures, including King Arthur's son as a central character (2013–2020)
 The Fall of Arthur by J.R.R. Tolkien (published 2013, written circa 1920–30s)
The Devices Trilogy by Philip Purser-Hallard, starting with The Pendragon Protocol (2014)
The Eighth Day series by Dianne K. Salerni (2014)
 The Buried Giant by Kazuo Ishiguro (2015)
Garden of Avalon by Kinoko Nasu
Harley Merlin by Bella Forrest (2018)
Camelot Rising trilogy by Kiersten White
The Guinevere Deception (2019)
The Camelot Betrayal (2020)
The Excalibur Curse (2021)
Seven Endless Forests by April Genevieve Tucholke (2020)
Legendborn by Tracy Deonn (2020)

Nonfiction
 Arthur's Britain by Leslie Alcock
 The Quest for Arthur's Britain by Geoffrey Ashe
 The Medieval Quest for Arthur by Robert Rouse and Cory Rushton
 The Quest for Merlin by Nikolai Tolstoy (1985)
 The Age of Arthur: A History of the British Isles from 350 to 650 John Morris
 The Reign of Arthur by Christopher Gidlow
 King Arthur: The Making of the Legend by Nicholas J. Higham
 King Arthur: Myth-Making and History by  Nicholas J. Higham
 The Development of Arthurian Romance by Roger Sherman Loomis
 Arthurian Literature in the Middle Ages edited by Roger Sherman Loomis

Depictions in other media
 List of works based on Arthurian legends

References

External links
Camelot Project
Bibliography of International Arthurian Society

 
 
Fantasy bibliographies